The Talking Horse and the Sad Girl and the Village Under the Sea is a collection of poetry by Mark Haddon published in 2005.

References

2005 poetry books
English poetry collections
Picador (imprint) books